Leonard Harper may refer to:
 Leonard Harper (producer)
 Leonard Harper (politician) (1837–1915), New Zealand explorer, lawyer and MP
 Leonard Harper (cricketer)